Behind Bars is the third studio album by the British-American rapper Slick Rick, released in 1994 on Def Jam Recordings.

Behind Bars peaked at number 51 on the Billboard 200, and number 11 on the Top R&B/Hip-Hop Albums chart. The album spawned two singles, "Behind Bars" and "Sittin' in My Car", which made it to number 12 and number 11 on the Hot Rap Singles, respectively.

Production
The album contains production from Vance Wright, Pete Rock, Large Professor, Easy Mo Bee, and Warren G. Doug E. Fresh, Nice & Smooth, and Warren G make guest appearances on a few tracks. Like The Ruler's Back, Rick recorded the album while on furlough from prison, and the music was constructed around his vocals—on some tracks, years after being recorded. Part of the album was also recorded during a 1993 work release period.

Critical reception
Trouser Press wrote that the album "touches on the live-from-inside chill of an Iceberg Slim novel in the title track, but otherwise doesn’t mention [Rick's incarceration] ... Rick doesn’t seem very connected to the music, but his complaints ring with the rancid air of preoccupation by someone with too much time to obsess about his frustrations." Vibe thought that "Rick's legendary street brilliance and sparkling, charming wit can even be distilled from behind bars." The Independent praised Rick's "worldly, laconic delivery and freewheeling, unexpurgated tales of everyday B-boy tribulations." The Spin Alternative Record Guide opined: "When the fantasy and reality collapse into one another ... the effect is a hip-hop revelation, opening a new space in the black male autobiographical narrative."

Track listing

Personnel 
 Slick Rick - performer, producer
 Warren G - performer, producer, remixing
 Nice & Smooth - performer, producer
 Doug E. Fresh - performer
 Vance Wright - producer
 Prince Paul - producer
 Pete Rock - producer, remixing
 Large Professor - producer, remixing
 Easy Mo Bee - producer
 Al "Purple" Hayes - bass
 Joe Quinde - engineer, mixing, mixing engineer
 Yianni Papadopoulos - engineer, mixing
 Darroll Gustamachio - engineer
 Doug Wilson - engineer
 Mike Glowik - assistant engineer, mixing assistant
 Leroy Southwell - assistant engineer
 Rich July - remixing, mixing, mixing engineer
 Djinji Brown - remixing, mixing engineer
 Greg Geitzenauer - remixing, mixing engineer
 Epitome of Scratch - remixing

Charts

Weekly charts

Year-end charts

References

External links 
Behind Bars at Discogs

1994 albums
Slick Rick albums
Def Jam Recordings albums
Albums produced by Easy Mo Bee
Albums produced by Pete Rock
Albums produced by Large Professor
Albums produced by Warren G